Jonathan Rée (born 1948) is a British freelance historian and philosopher from Bradford. Educated at Sussex University and then at Oxford, Rée was previously a professor of philosophy at Middlesex University, but gave up a teaching career in order to "have more time to think".

He has written for the New Humanist, Evening Standard, Frankfurter Allgemeine Zeitung, Lingua Franca, London Review of Books, Prospect, The Independent, The Times Literary Supplement, and Rising East. He is frequently a guest in radio programmes such as Journeys In Thought and In Our Time. In the early 1990s he presented a seven-part Channel 4 TV series (produced and broadcast in the UK) Talking Liberties, which featured Rée in conversation with a number of thinkers, including Jacques Derrida, Paul Ricoeur, and Edward Said. Rée was a founding member of the British journal and group Radical Philosophy.

Bibliography

 Descartes, Philosophy and its Past (1974, Allen Lane) 
 Proletarian Philosophers (1984, Oxford University Press) 
 Philosophical Tales (1987, Routledge) 
 Philosophy and its Past (1978, Humanities Press) 
 Heidegger (1999, Routledge)  
 Kierkegaard: A Critical Reader (1998, John Wiley & Sons)  
 I See a Voice, (2000, Metropolitan Books) 
 The Concise Encyclopedia of Western Philosophy (2005, Routledge) 
 Witcraft: The Invention of Philosophy in English (2019, Allen Lane) 
 A Schoolmaster's War: Harry Ree - A British Agent in the French Resistance (2020, Yale University Press)

Critical studies and reviews of Rée's work
A schoolmaster's war

External links
 Radical Philosophy – Jonathan Rée archive

References

1948 births
Alumni of the University of Oxford
Alumni of the University of Sussex
Descartes scholars
English essayists
English male non-fiction writers
English historians
English philosophers
Heidegger scholars
Historians of philosophy
Kierkegaard scholars
Living people
Philosophy academics
Philosophy writers
Place of birth missing (living people)